Rêves Mécaniques is the second solo album by The Hacker. It was released in 2004 on Different. The record features guest vocalists Perspects (Le Car), Mount Sims, and Miss Kittin.

The Hacker and Miss Kittin performed the song "Masterplan" at the Sónar festival, which was included on Miss Kittin's album Live at Sónar.

Track listing

Personnel
 Michel Amato - producer
 Echo Danon - vocals 
 Mount Sims - vocals
 Pompon - mastering

Source:

Charts

References

2004 albums
The Hacker albums